DH, Dh, dh, or dH may refer to:

Places
 DH postcode area, in the United Kingdom for the area of Durham and surrounding towns
 Diamond Head, Hawaii, a volcanic tuff cone on Oʻahu

Organisations
 D+H, a Canadian financial services company
 Department of Health (United Kingdom), a department of the UK government
 DH Press, the Dark Horse Comics imprint that publishes novels
 Deccan Herald, an Indian newspaper

Science and technology
 Denavit–Hartenberg parameters, a type of robotics convention
 Dermatitis herpetiformis, a skin disease
 DH register, the high byte of a DX register in x86-compatible microprocessors
 Diffie-Hellman key exchange (D-H), a specific method of securely exchanging cryptographic keys over a public channel
 District heating, a method of heating multiple buildings from a central location
 Doubled haploidy, a genetic status
 Deuterium:protium (D:H), a ratio in deuterium-depleted water
°dH, deutsche Härte, a unit of water hardness
 Dorsal horn of the spinal cord, or posterior grey column

Sports
 Designated hitter, a baseball rule
 Doubleheader (baseball)
 Doubleheader (television)
 Downhill (ski competition), a skiing discipline
 Downhill mountain biking, a bicycling discipline

Transportation
 de Havilland, a former UK aircraft manufacturer
 Decision height, in aviation
 Delaware and Hudson Railway 
 Independence Air (IATA code)

Other uses
 Dh (digraph), in linguistics
 Dear husband, a shorthand phrase common in online forums
 Donor husband
 Digital humanities, a community of practice combining technology with humanistic inquiry
 Documentary hypothesis or Wellhausen hypothesis, describing the origins of Judeo-Christian scripture
 Domestic Helper
 Informal abbreviation for Harry Potter and the Deathly Hallows

See also
 Degrees of general hardness (dGH), a unit of water hardness
 Dirham, a unit of currency in several Arab states
 Moroccan Dirham abbreviated as Dh
 United Arab Emirates dirham, unofficially abbreviated DH